Events from the year 1750 in Austria

Incumbents
 Monarch – Maria Theresa

Events

 - Order of Elizabeth and Theresa

Births

Deaths

References

 
Years of the 18th century in Austria